The Edmonton provincial electoral district also known as Edmonton City from 1905 to 1909, was a provincial electoral district in Alberta, Canada mandated to return members to the Legislative Assembly of Alberta from 1905 to 1917 and again from 1921 to 1959.

The Edmonton electoral district existed in two incarnations from 1905 - 1909 and again from 1921 - 1955, with the city (small as it was in former times) broken up into separate single-member constituencies in the other time-periods.  The district was created when Alberta became a province, to encompass residents of the city of Edmonton on the northside of the North Saskatchewan River. The Edmonton district was extended to the southside of the river in 1921, By that time, the southside City of Strathcona had merged into the City of Edmonton. 

From 1909 to 1913 and from 1921 to 1956, the Edmonton provincial constituency elected multiple members.
In 1909 and 1913, Edmonton voters could cast up to two votes each (the same number as there were seats). In 1921 they could cast up to five votes (the same number as there were seats). Edmonton used Single transferable voting in general elections held between 1926 and 1955, where each voter cast one transferable vote. In the province's history, there were three multi-member districts, the other ones being Calgary and Medicine Hat.

History
Three methods of electing representatives were used over the years in the Edmonton district.

First past the post election of a single member was used in 1905 (and in all by-elections up to 1920).

Block voting (voters able to cast as many votes as there were seats, that is, 2) was used in 1909 and 1913 and with five seats in 1921.

The Edmonton constituency was divided into two single-member constituencies for the provincial election of 1917: Edmonton East and Edmonton West. The adjacent constituency of Edmonton South had been renamed from the old constituency of Strathcona.

The three Edmonton districts were merged to form the Edmonton constituency in 1921, and block voting was established in 1921, to elect five members in the constituency.

As a semblance of proportional representation, the UFA government brought in ranked voting for all constituencies starting in 1924. It maintained Edmonton, Calgary and Medicine Hat as multi-member constituencies, with seats now apportioned as per Single transferable vote, which at the time was called the Hare system. Instant-runoff voting was used outside those multi-member districts and was also used in provincial by-elections during this period. 

Edmonton had five seats in 1926, then six seats in 1930 and 1935, then five until 1948. Edmonton had seven seats elected at-large in 1952 and 1955.

In 1959 the Social Credit government broke up the Calgary and Edmonton constituencies and replaced the transferable balloting with first-past-the-post single-member districts across the province. Eight constituencies were created in Edmonton: Edmonton Centre, Edmonton North, Edmonton Norwood, Edmonton North East, Edmonton North West, Jasper West, Strathcona Centre, Strathcona East and Strathcona West.

Expansion of seats and districts in Edmonton
The first table shows at a glance, the number of seats available by general election year for the Edmonton riding. The second table shows the number of districts in Edmonton, when the Edmonton riding was broken up.

Seats

After 1956, all Alberta MLAs were elected in single member districts so since then the number of districts has been the same as the number of seats as shown in the next table.

Districts

For the 1913 election, Edmonton South Provincial electoral district was created from the old Strathcona constituency to elect one MLA. The Edmonton constituency elected two members by the block vote system.

Edmonton party composition at a glance
The representation elected from 1926 to 1955 can be seen to be more mixed and balanced than representation elected both before and after that period. Not shown in the table below is the fact that in 1959 one party took all the Edmonton seats. 
Prior to 1926, Edmonton elected its members using First past the post or Block voting. 
District-level proportional representation (Single transferable voting was used from 1924 to 1955.
Since 1955, Edmonton has elected its MLAs through First past the post.

(Note: Independents in the 1940s were members of the Unity League, an anti-SC coalition of Liberal and Conservatives.)

(Note: The "1942" column shows the change made by the 1942 by-election when Elmer Roper was elected.)

Election results

1905 general election

1909 general election
This election was conducted using block voting, where each Edmonton voter could cast up to two votes.

1912 by-election

1913 general election
In the 1913 Alberta general election Premier Arthur Sifton, his lieutenant Charles Wilson Cross and Liberal candidate Alexander Grant MacKay each won nominations in two electoral districts. The Calgary Herald (a Conservative newspaper) surmised that Sifton and Cross were so scared of the electorate they felt they might not win if they ran in just one district. It accused Premier Sifton of having little confidence in his ability to return his government to power. Charles Cross would sit as a member of the Legislative Assembly of Alberta for both Edmonton and Edson.

This election was conducted using block voting, where each Edmonton voter could cast up to two votes.

1921 general election
This election was conducted using block voting, where each Edmonton voter could cast up to five votes. The percentages shown in the table below indicate the proportion of the voters casting votes who may have cast votes in the candidate's favour. For example, a third of the voters casting all five of their votes for the Liberals would accrue a total of 150 "percent" of the votes while the candidates would still only receive the support of a third of the voters. With the rest of the votes split among other parties, the Liberals with only a third of the voter support did take all the Edmonton seats in this election.

1924 Edmonton by-Election
This was the first election in Alberta to use ranked voting in Instant-runoff voting, a system just introduced for elections of single members in by-elections in Alberta's largest cities.

W.T. Henry got the most votes in the first count but no candidate received a majority of them so subsequent counts were held using second choices of the lower-ranking candidates. He was elected on third count.
 
Communist Party candidate H.M. Bartholomew showed strong third place showing, almost exceeding Conservative candidate on the second count.

1926 general election
The sum of the candidates' vote totals below do not equal the "total" recorded here because of the number of spoiled ballots, an unfortunate by-product of STV. 15,130 valid ballots were cast in Edmonton in this election. About 3000 were rejected for being improperly filled out - the preferential voting used in Edmonton's new STV was still new to voters. Voters had the right not mark to many back-up preferences or none at all. But some apparently tried it but did it improperly.

Under the STV procedure used (the Hare system), the quota necessary to win a seat was 3026 (15,130 divided by 5, the number of seats being contested). Prevey and Duggan won seats without the quota in the last counts, after other candidates were dropped out. As candidates were eliminated, their votes were transferred to the remaining candidates in accordance with back-up preferences marked by the voter. With voters at complete liberty to rank the candidates along whatever criterion they wanted, some votes were transferred across party lines. Thus naturally the end result could differ from the initial first preferences.  

The result in this election was roughly proportional to each party's take of the first preference votes with two Conservatives, a Liberal, a Labour and a UFA winning seats. Labour and UFA were elected to their first Edmonton seat in this election, Edmonton's first PR election. 

The UFA ran one candidate Lymburn. He led the polls, achieving quota in the first count and being declared elected. He was elected with just first preferences, all the other successful candidates would be elected with mixture of first preference votes and votes transferred to them through back-up preferences from unsuccessful candidates. There also had a small number of votes received by early successful candidates that were transferred due to being surplus to the quota.

Not all the five candidates who were most popular in the first count were elected in the end.

Independent Liberal Joe Clarke received many votes on the first count but did not make quota in first count and did not pick up enough votes from other candidates' later preferences to get quota, likely due to not being in a political party. 

Liberal candidate J.C. Bowen was in the top five in first count, but also did not get quota and despite being in a party, was not elected - many of the other Liberal party candidates' votes were transferred not to him but instead to another Liberal candidate, Prevey, a more popular individual overall, it seems. Eventually Prevey's vote total surpassed Bowen's and Bowen, not Prevey, was eliminated when his turn came.

Labour although not having anyone in top five spots in first count, did capture a seat. This was proportional - it received about 20 percent of the vote spread over five candidates. STV's transferable votes generally prevent problems caused by vote splitting. Farmilo, the leading labour candidate in the first count, was not elected though. Gibbs apparently as an individual was more popular overall than Farmilo. He got quota in later counts through distribution of other candidates' second preferences. This included some of Joe Clarke's supporters for example

The Conservative party ran five candidates. The vote was spread among all five in the first count. None got quota in the first count. Weaver did later when three of his companion Conservative candidates were eliminated. Duggan got a seat by being one of the last ones still standing as the field of candidates thinned to the number of remaining open seats, at which time all the remaining candidates - Conservative Duggan and Liberal Prevey - were declared elected, although not having quota.

1930 general election

1935 general election

1936 Edmonton by-election
Instant-runoff voting but no vote transfers conducted
Liberal W. Morrish elected with majority of votes on the first count.

1937 Edmonton by-election
Instant-runoff voting but no vote transfers were conducted.

Liberal E.L. Gray was elected with majority of votes on the first count.

1940 general election
Five seats were open in this election. The Hare quota, the number of votes needed to win a seat, was 7291.

This election saw an anti-SC movement, made up of Liberals, Conservatives and some UFA-ers, get many seats. Page, Duggan and Macdonald were elected in Edmonton this election as candidates of the People's League AKA Unity Movement, recorded as Independent in results below. 
Four of that group's candidates placed in the top five spots in the first count, but this was un-proportional and the process thinned them down.

SC candidate Norman James placed low in the first count but got enough votes from other candidates who were dropped out, and from Manning's surplus votes, to take a seat, pushing out O'Connor, a Unity League candidate. He did this without achieving quota but by being one of the last ones standing when the field of candidates thinned out. Due to his personal popularity, he leapfrogged over a couple SC candidates to take the seat, demonstrating that the STV-PR is about voters' preferences for individual candidates and not party lists.

Many of the candidates listed as Independents, such as sitting MLA D.M. Duggan, were candidates for the Unity League, an anti-SC alliance of Conservatives and Liberals.

1942 by-election
After D.M. Duggan's passing in May 1942, his Edmonton seat was filled in a by-election.

This by-election was run according to Instant-runoff voting, which was used for all by-elections in Alberta in the 1924-1955 period. Voters across Edmonton voted as the city was a single constituency at this time.

There was only one seat being contested. Under IRV ( Alternative Vote), the winner had to take a majority of the valid votes.

Lymburn, a former UFA cabinet minister, was running as an anti-SC Unity League candidate. He did well in the first count surpassing the vote total of the SC candidate; but both being passed by CCF-er Roper. Roper however did not take a majority of the vote. 

It became a tight race between front-runners Roper and Lymburn. The winner was not named until the fourth round after three of the five candidates had been eliminated and their second preferences distributed. There was such a high number of exhausted ballots because about half of the voters who voted for the SC, Soldiers Rep and Liberal candidates did not give second preferences.

But finally when the SC candidate, the third from the bottom in the first count, was dropped off in the fourth round, there were only two candidates and one or the other of the candidates would take a majority of the votes still in play. It is possible that in the last round, when the SC candidate was dropped off, most of his voters' second preferences went to Roper, apparently being thought more in tune with SC's help-the-little-guy philosophy than the business-minded Conservative/Liberal-member-dominated Unity League.

1944 general election
This election was held under Hare Single Transferable Voting STV-PR system.

1944 Hare quota was 6306 (one-fifth of the total valid ballots). Premier Manning got it in first count. His surplus votes (enough on their own to elect another candidate) were apparently spread among the other four SC candidates (or sent elsewhere or maybe his supporters did not put down a second preference) so none of the other SC candidates received enough to take a seat right off.

Page, running for the anti-SC Unity League, here identified as Independent, was in top five in the first count. The League, winding down, ran only one candidate and League votes were not spread around. He took enough votes in the first count to hold on to take a seat in later counts.

Johnnie Caine, a WWII ace, running as an Independent, was personally popular but did not get quota in the first count and not having a party behind him, did not receive many of the other candidates' second preferences when they were dropped off.

The first candidates to be dropped were mostly Communists and CCF candidates, whose voters it seems gave their second preferences to their own, such as Roper who took a seat, and then eventually to Norman James, of the SC party. He and William J. Williams were the last two standing when the field of candidates thinned out and they took seats even without achieving the quota.

1948 general election
This election was held under Single Transferable Voting STV-PR system, using the Droop quota.

The 1948 Hare quota was 7692. Manning got it in first count. His surplus votes probably helped elect other two SC candidates.

Prowse also got quota but no other Liberal got in on his shirt-tails.

Elmer Roper too exceeded quota. His surplus was not distributed, perhaps because by then the count was at an end with only two candidates left standing to fill two remaining seats. Two SC-ers, Heard and Clayton, took these without achieving quota.

Result was roughly proportional to the three parties that ran in this contest. (The Conservatives stayed out, supporting Page, an opponent of the SC government, running for the Independent Citizens' Association.)

Premier Manning alone took almost half the votes in the first count, and his party took more than half the seats. The CCF took one sixth of the votes and one-fifth of the seats. The Liberals took about one-fifth the votes and one-fifth of the seats. Only about one-tenth of the votes were wasted - this included Page.

On a candidate basis, two of the top five in the first count were not elected. Page was not popular with enough second preferences, while Liberal Lazarowich also did not have holding power.

1952 general election
This election was held under Hare Single Transferable Voting STV-PR system.

1955 general election
This election was held under Hare Single Transferable Voting STV-PR system.

Seven members being elected (through STV)
Total votes cast: 82,792 votes
Quota: 9569. This amount guaranteed election but it was possible to be elected with fewer votes.

By-Elections, 1924-1937
These by-elections were conducted using Instant-runoff voting (Alternative Voting).

Plebiscite results

1948 Electrification Plebiscite
District results from the first province wide plebiscite on electricity regulation.

1957 liquor plebiscite

On October 30, 1957 a stand-alone plebiscite was held province wide in all 50 of the then current provincial electoral districts in Alberta. The government decided to consult Alberta voters to decide on liquor sales and mixed drinking after a divisive debate in the Legislature. The plebiscite was intended to deal with the growing demand for reforming antiquated liquor control laws.

The plebiscite was conducted in two parts. Question A asked in all districts, asked the voters if the sale of liquor should be expanded in Alberta, while Question B asked in a handful of districts within the corporate limits of Calgary and Edmonton asked if men and woman were allowed to drink together in establishments. Question B was slightly modified depending on which city the voters were in.

Province wide Question A of the plebiscite passed in 33 of the 50 districts while Question B passed in all five districts. Edmonton voted overwhelmingly in favor of the plebiscite. The district recorded slightly above average voter turnout almost just over the province wide 46% average with over half of eligible voters casting a ballot.

Edmonton also voted on Question B2. Residents voted for mixed drinking with a super majority. Turnout for question B. Turnout for Question B was slightly lower and than Question A.

Official district returns were released to the public on December 31, 1957. The Social Credit government in power at the time did not considered the results binding. However the results of the vote led the government to repeal all existing liquor legislation and introduce an entirely new Liquor Act.

Municipal districts lying inside electoral districts that voted against the Plebiscite were designated Local Option Zones by the Alberta Liquor Control Board and considered effective dry zones, business owners that wanted a license had to petition for a binding municipal plebiscite in order to be granted a license.

See also
List of Alberta provincial electoral districts

References

Further reading

External links
Elections Alberta
The Legislative Assembly of Alberta

Former provincial electoral districts of Alberta
Politics of Edmonton